IQ Aurigae is a (most likely) single, variable star in the northern constellation of Auriga. It is visible to the naked eye as a dim, white-hued star with an apparent visual magnitude that fluctuates around 5.38. The star is located at a distance of about 460 light-years from the Sun based on parallax and is drifting further away with a radial velocity of +28.6 km/s.

This is a magnetic Ap star with a stellar classification of A0pSi. It is known as a silicon star, having a strong line of singly ionized silicon, and may also be helium deficient as the lines of helium are weaker than expected. The star is an Alpha2 Canum Venaticorum-type variable, ranging in magnitude from 5.35 down to 5.43 with a rotationally-modulated period of 2.4660 days.

IQ Aurigae is 6.3 million years old and is spinning with a projected rotational velocity of 49 km/s, giving it a rotation period of 2.47 days. It has nearly four times the mass of the Sun and 2.6 times the Sun's radius. The star is radiating 263 times the luminosity of the Sun from its active photosphere at an effective temperature of 14,454 K.

References

External links
 HR 1732
 Image IQ Aurigae

A-type main-sequence stars
Ap stars
Alpha2 Canum Venaticorum variables
Astronomical X-ray sources

Auriga (constellation)
Durchmusterung objects
034452
024799
1732
Aurigae, IQ